The Chapman Branch Library in Salt Lake City, Utah, United States, is a Carnegie library that was funded by a $25,000 Carnegie Foundation grant and was built in 1918. It was listed on the National Register of Historic Places in 1980.

Description
The library was named after Annie E. Chapman, first librarian of the Salt Lake City public library system.

It is an L-shaped building designed in Classical Revival architecture by architect Don Carlos Young, Jr., who also designed the layout of the University of Utah campus and a number of LDS buildings.  At the time of its dedication, a Deseret News account declared it "'the beginning of the greatest social, intellectual and civic development the west side of the city has yet known.'!".

See also

 National Register of Historic Places listings in Salt Lake City

References

External links

Library buildings completed in 1918
Buildings and structures in Salt Lake City
Neoclassical architecture in Utah
Libraries on the National Register of Historic Places in Utah
National Register of Historic Places in Salt Lake City